Radio Goražde is a Bosnian regional public radio station, broadcasting from Goražde, Bosnia and Herzegovina.

Radio Goražde was launched on 27 July 1970 by the municipal council of Goražde. In Yugoslavia and in SR Bosnia and Herzegovina, it was part of local/municipal Radio Sarajevo network affiliate.

This radio station broadcasts a variety of programs such as music, sport, local news and talk shows. Program is mainly produced in Bosnian language and it is available in municipalities of Bosnian Podrinje area. RTV BPK is also part of municipal services.

For the oldest radio station in  Bosnian Podrinje Canton, estimated number of potential listeners of Radio Goražde is around 25,761.

Radio Goražde is also available via IPTV platform Moja TV on channel 196.

Frequencies
The program is currently broadcast on 2 frequencies:

 Goražde  
 Goražde

See also 
List of radio stations in Bosnia and Herzegovina

References

External links 
 www.rtvbpk.ba 
 Communications Regulatory Agency of Bosnia and Herzegovina

Bihać
Radio stations established in 1970